In music, the minor diatonic semitone is a ratio of 17:16, making it the seventeenth harmonic or partial. This is in contrast to the 5-limit major diatonic semitone of 16/15.

See also
Septimal diatonic semitone

References

17-limit tuning and intervals
Harmonic series (music)
Just tuning and intervals
Minor intervals
Seconds (music)
0017:0016